David Slíva was a Czech tennis player. He competed for Bohemia in the men's singles and doubles events at the 1908 Summer Olympics.

References

Year of birth missing
Year of death missing
Czech male tennis players
Olympic tennis players of Bohemia
Tennis players at the 1908 Summer Olympics
Place of birth missing